Lola Le Lann (born 9 February 1996) is a French actress and singer-songwriter. She is known for her roles in One Wild Moment (2015), A Bluebird in My Heart (2018) and Versus (2019).

Early life
She is the daughter of jazz trumpeter, Éric Le Lann and actress and filmmaker, Valérie Stroh.

Music
Albums
Source:
 Glaz (2020)
 Odeur PMU (2021)

In 2020, Le Lann delayed the launch of her new album after one of her collaborators was accused of sexual misconduct.

Filmography

Le Lann made her acting debut in Jean-François Richet's 2015 comedy, One Wild Moment starring alongside Vincent Cassel, François Cluzet and Alice Isaaz, where she portrayed a 17-year-old girl who falls in love with her friend's father. In 2018, she starred in A Bluebird in My Heart and the television series War on Beasts. In 2019, she appeared in her third film, Versus. Apeared in seaison 2 of Ganglands (Braqueurs) 2023

References

External links

 
 A day in the country with Lola Le Lann and Ralph Lauren | Vogue Paris X Ralph Lauren

1996 births
Living people
French film actresses
French television actresses
21st-century French actresses
21st-century French women singers